Naan Sollum Ragasiyam is a 1959 Indian Tamil-language film, directed by P. Sridhar Rao and produced by V. C. Subburaman. The film stars Sivaji Ganesan and Anjali Devi. It was released on 7 March 1959.

Plot

Cast 
 Sivaji Ganesan as Karunakaran
 Anjali Devi as Manorama
 K. A. Thangavelu as Vadivelu
 J. P. Chandrababu as Doctor Shailak
 S. V. Subbaiah as Velayutham
 S. R. Dhasarathan as Ravi
 K. M Nambirajan as Govindan
 Rama Rao as the patient
 Nalli Subbiah as Kuppusami
 Dharmarajan as the drunkard
 G. Mani as Somu
 M. N. Rajam as Kala
 G. Sakunthala as Rosy
 C. K. Saraswathi as Akilandam
 Manorama as Kamakshi
 N. Rukmani as Kuppusami's wife

Soundtrack 
The music composed by G. Ramanathan. All lyrics were by A. Maruthakasi.

Release 
Naan Sollum Ragasiyam was released on 7 March 1959, delayed from 27 February. Kanthan of Kalki said the secret of the film might be its failure.

References

External links 
 

1959 films
1950s Tamil-language films
Films scored by G. Ramanathan